Mae Questel  (born Mae Kwestel, September 13, 1908 – January 4, 1998) was an American actress. She was best known for providing the voices for the animated characters Betty Boop (from 1931) and Olive Oyl (from 1933). She began in vaudeville, primarily working as an impressionist. She later performed on Broadway and in films and television, including her role as Aunt Bethany in National Lampoon's Christmas Vacation (1989).

Early career and Betty Boop
Born Mae Kwestel in the Bronx, New York City, to Simon and Freida (née Glauberman) Kwestel, she attended Morris High School and studied acting at the American Theatre Wing and with the Theatre Guild. Although she wanted to be an entertainer, her parents, who were Orthodox Jews, actively discouraged her from doing so, at one point forcing her to leave the Theatre Guild school.

Nevertheless, at the age of 17, Questel won a talent contest held at the RKO Fordham Theatre in the Bronx by imitating actress and singer Helen Kane. She was signed by an agent and began performing in vaudeville as an impersonator. Billed as "Mae Questel – Personality Singer of Personality Songs", she did impressions of Fanny Brice, Marlene Dietrich, Eddie Cantor, Mae West, Maurice Chevalier and others, as well as doing animal imitations. She was seen by animator Max Fleischer, who was looking for an actress to provide the voice for his Betty Boop character. Questel's "Boop-boop-a-doop" routine, done in a style similar to the version Helen Kane created, while at the same time evoking something of the naughty allure of film star Clara Bow, was exactly what Fleischer wanted, and he hired Questel in 1931. She began as one of a number of actresses providing the character's voice, but soon took over the role exclusively.

From 1931 until 1939, Questel provided the voice of Betty Boop in more than 50 animated shorts, the longest run for any actress doing that voice. During the 1930s, she released a recording of "On the Good Ship Lollipop" which sold more than two million copies. In 1988, she reprised her role as Betty Boop in a cameo appearance in Who Framed Roger Rabbit, which was Questel's most extensive work for Disney; she had provided brief additional voices for some of Disney's earlier films. Along with her voice work, and occasional on-camera appearance in Paramount shorts, Questel also attended Columbia University, where she studied drama.

Olive Oyl
Beginning in 1933, Questel provided the voice for Olive Oyl in the Max Fleischer Popeye cartoons. She made her debut with "I Eats Me Spinach" and essentially became the permanent voice until her hiatus to start a family in 1938. She reportedly based Olive's nasal vocal quality and expression, "Oh, dear!" on the character actress ZaSu Pitts. 

Starting in 1938, Margie Hines, who was the original voice of Betty Boop, replaced Mae Questel when production made the transition to the Miami Studio, Florida. Questel returned as the voice of Olive Oyl in 1944 after the studio reorganized as Famous Studios, Paramount Pictures and had returned to New York, a role in which she would remain until 1962. She also filled in for Jack Mercer as the voice of Popeye for a small number of cartoons, made when Mercer was temporarily drawn into war service, alongside Floyd Buckley and Harry Foster Welch.

When Hanna-Barbera began making the All New Popeye cartoons for television in 1978, Questel auditioned for the role of Olive Oyl but lost out to Marilyn Schreffler.

Other voices
In addition to her signature voices of Betty Boop and Olive Oyl, Questel also provided the voice of Little Audrey. In 1958, she voiced Wendy the Good Little Witch in the theatrical Casper cartoon short Which is Witch. In the 1950s, she was the voice for the title character of the pioneering interactive Saturday-morning cartoon series Winky Dink and You. She provided the voice of Casper, the Friendly Ghost in Golden Records' Casper the Friendly Ghost and Little Audrey Says in 1962.

In The Flintstones series she voiced characters from the spin-offs The Pebbles and Bamm-Bamm Show, The Flintstone Comedy Hour and the Flintstone Frolics. She voiced Wiggy Rockstone after the original voice actress, Gay Autterson, left the role in 1982.

She continued to provide the voices of Betty Boop and Olive Oyl in commercials, television specials and elsewhere for the rest of her life. In 1988, she reprised her role as Betty Boop in the film Who Framed Roger Rabbit.

In 1935, Mae Questel played the voice of the Woman in the Shoe in the Max Fleischer cartoon, The Kids in the Shoe.

On-camera roles
Questel played a number of small parts, including appearing with Rudy Vallee as Betty Boop in the 1931 short Musical Justice (1931) and as a nurse in The Musical Doctor in 1932.

In 1962, she played a Jewish mother in an episode of crime drama Naked City.

In 1961, she was seen as a middle-aged bride in Jerry Lewis' It's Only Money, one of Fanny Brice's mother's card-playing friends at the start of the film Funny Girl in 1968, and as the "Jewish Mama from Hell" in New York Stories in 1989 in Woody Allen's segment titled "Oedipus Wrecks"; she had earlier sung the song "Chameleon Days" on the soundtrack for Allen's film Zelig in 1983. Her last non-voice appearance was as the elderly Aunt Bethany in 1989's National Lampoon's Christmas Vacation.

In 1973, Questel had a role in the short-lived ABC television sitcom The Corner Bar, but she achieved perhaps her greatest visibility in television commercials, notably playing "Aunt Bluebell" in ads for Scott Towels from 1971 to 1979, and appeared in spots for Playtex, Folger's Coffee and others.  She also appeared on panel shows and in daytime soap operas.

Broadway
Questel appeared on Broadway four times:
 Doctor Social (1948) with Dean Jagger
 Leonard Spigelgass' A Majority of One (1959) with Cedric Hardwicke and Barnard Hughes – she reprised her role (as "Essie Rubin") in the film adaptation
 Enter Laughing (1963) based on the novel by Carl Reiner, with Alan Arkin, Alan Mowbray, Sylvia Sidney and Michael J. Pollard and
 Bajour (1964), the Walter Marks musical, starring Herschel Bernardi, Nancy Dussault and Chita Rivera

Personal life
Questel married Leo Balkin on December 22, 1930, and they were divorced prior to 1950. She married Jack E. Shelby on November 19, 1970; they remained married until his death. She had two sons, Robert Balkin and Richard Balkin.

Politics
Questel was a Democrat who supported Adlai Stevenson's campaign during the 1952 presidential election.

Death
Questel died on January 4, 1998, from complications related to Alzheimer's disease at the age of 89 in her Manhattan apartment. She was buried in New Montefiore Cemetery in West Babylon, New York.

Selected filmography

 Silly Scandals (1931, Short) as Betty Boop (voice, uncredited)
 Bimbo's Initiation (1931, Short) as Betty Boop (voice, uncredited)
 Bimbo's Express (1931, Short) as Betty Boop (voice, uncredited)
 Minding the Baby (1931, Short) as Betty Boop (voice, uncredited)
 Kitty from Kansas City (1931, Short) as Betty Boop (voice, uncredited)
 Musical Justice (1931, Short) as Betty Boop (uncredited)
 Wayward (1932) as Showgirl (uncredited)
 Minnie the Moocher (1932, Short) as Betty Boop (voice, uncredited)
 One Hour with You (1932) as Office Worker (uncredited)
 Crazy Town (1932, Short) as Betty Boop / Beauty Shop Customer 1 / Beauty Shop Customer 2 (voice, uncredited)
 Stopping the Show (1932, Short) as Betty Boop / Aloysius (voice, uncredited)
 Betty Boop, M.D. (1932, Short) as Betty Boop (voice, uncredited)
 Betty Boop's Bamboo Isle (1932, Short) as Betty Boop (voice, uncredited)
 Betty Boop's Ups and Downs (1932, Short) as Betty Boop (voice, uncredited)
 Betty Boop for President (1932, Short) as Betty Boop (voice, uncredited)
 Betty Boop's Museum (1932, Short) as Betty Boop / Big Lady / Mummy (voice, uncredited)
 Betty Boop's Ker-Choo (1933, Short) as Betty Boop (voice, uncredited)
 Betty Boop's Crazy Inventions (1933, Short) as Betty Boop (voice, uncredited)
 Is My Palm Read (1933, Short) as Betty Boop (voice, uncredited)
 Snow White (1933, Short) as Betty Boop / Evil Queen (voice, uncredited)
 Mother Goose Land (1933, Short) as Betty Boop (voice, uncredited)
 Betty Boop's Penthouse (1933, Short) as Betty Boop (voice, uncredited)
 Popeye the Sailor (1933, Short) (voice, uncredited)
 I Heard (1933, Short) as Betty Boop (voice, uncredited)
 Morning, Moon and Night (1933, Short) as Betty Boop (voice, uncredited)
 Betty Boop's Hallowe'en Party (1933, Short) as Betty Boop / Aloysius (voice, uncredited)
 I Eats my Spinach (1933, Short) as Olive Oyl (voice, uncredited)
 The Old Man of the Mountain (1933, Short) as Betty Boop (voice, uncredited)
 Sock-a-bye, Baby (1934, Short) as Baby (voice, uncredited)
 Ha! Ha! Ha! (1934, Short) as Betty Boop (voice, uncredited)
 Betty in Blunderland (1934, Short) as Betty Boop (voice, uncredited)
 Can You Take It (1934, Short) as Olive Oyl (voice, uncredited)
 Betty Boop's Rise to Fame (1934, Short) as Betty Boop (voice, uncredited)
 Betty Boop's Trial (1934, Short) as Betty Boop (voice, uncredited)
 Betty Boop's Life Guard (1934, Short) as Betty Boop (voice, uncredited)
 There's Something About a Soldier (1934, Short) as Betty Boop (voice, uncredited)
 Betty Boop's Little Pal (1934, Short) as Betty Boop, Pudgy (voice, uncredited)
 Betty Boop's Prize Show (1934, Short) as Betty Boop (voice, uncredited)
 Baby Be Good (1935, Short) as Betty Boop (voice, uncredited)
 Stop That Noise (1935, Short) as Betty Boop (voice, uncredited)
 Pleased to Meet Cha! (1935, Short) as Betty Boop (voice, uncredited)
 Swat the Fly (1935, Short) as Betty Boop (voice, uncredited)
 The 'Hip-Nut-Tist''' (1935, Short) as Betty Boop (voice, uncredited)
 The Kids in the Shoe (1935, Short) as The Woman in the Shoe (voice, uncredited)
 No! No! A Thousand Times No!! (1935, Short) as Betty Boop (voice, uncredited)
 Choose Your 'Weppins (1935, Short) as Betty Boop (voice, uncredited)
 A Little Soap and Water (1935, Short) as Betty Boop (voice, uncredited)
 A Language All My Own (1935, Short) as Betty Boop (voice, uncredited)
 Betty Boop and Grampy (1935, Short) as Betty Boop (voice, uncredited)
 Making Stars (1935, Short) as Betty Boop / Babies (voice, uncredited)
 Adventures with Popeye (1935, Short) as Olive Oyl (voice, uncredited)
 The Spinach Overture (1935, Short) as Olive Oyl (voice, uncredited)
 Betty Boop with Henry, the Funniest Living American (1935, Short) as Betty Boop (voice, uncredited)
 Vim, Vigor and Vitaliky (1936, Short) as Olive Oyl (voice, uncredited)
 Somewhere in Dreamland (1936, Short) as Mother / Boy / Girl (voice, uncredited)
 The Great Ziegfeld (1936) as Rosie (uncredited)
 Be Human (1936, Short) as Betty Boop (voice, uncredited)
 Christmas Comes But Once a Year (1936, Short) as Orphans (voice, uncredited)
 Making Friends (1936, Short) as Betty Boop (voice, uncredited)
 Bridge Ahoy! (1936, Short) as Olive Oyl (voice, uncredited)
 House Cleaning Blues (1937, Short) as Betty Boop (voice, uncredited)
 Whoops! I'm a Cowboy (1937, Short) as Betty Boop (voice, uncredited)
 The Hot Air Salesman (1937, Short) as Betty Boop (voice, uncredited)
 Bells Are Ringing (1960) as Olga (voice, uncredited)
 A Majority of One (1961) as Essie Rubin
 It's Only Money (1962) as Cecilia Albright
 Funny Girl (1968) as Mrs. Strakosh
 Move (1970) as Mrs. Katz
 Zelig (1983) as Helen Kane (voice, uncredited)
 Commercial promoting the Popeye video game (1983) as Olive Oyl (voice, uncredited)
 Hot Resort (1985) as Mrs. Labowitz
 Who Framed Roger Rabbit (1988) as Betty Boop (voice)
 New York Stories (1989) as Mother (segment "Oedipus Wrecks")
 National Lampoon's Christmas Vacation (1989) as Bethany (final film role)

See also
 

ReferencesNotes'Further reading
 Taylor, James D. Jr. The Voice of Betty Boop, Mae Questel''. New York: Algora Publishing, 2016.

External links
 
 
 
 
 
 Mae Questel at the Internet Archive
 
 

1908 births
1998 deaths
Actresses from New York City
American film actresses
American musical theatre actresses
American stage actresses
American radio actresses
Deaths from dementia in New York (state)
Deaths from Alzheimer's disease
Jewish American actresses
Animal impersonators
People from the Bronx
People from West Babylon, New York
Vaudeville performers
20th-century American actresses
20th-century American women singers
20th-century American singers
Burials at New Montefiore Cemetery
New York (state) Democrats
California Democrats
Paramount Pictures contract players
Fleischer Studios people
Famous Studios people
20th-century American Jews